Earthquakes in Saudi Arabia are infrequent and usually occur in the western portion of the country near the Red Sea or the Gulf of Aqaba.

See also
Geology of Saudi Arabia

References

Sources

 
Saudi Arabia
Earthquakes